Sadiq Sillah (born October 19, 1969) is a Sierra Leonean politician and the current District Council Chairman of Pujehun District in Southern Sierra Leone. He is a member of the Sierra Leone People's Party (SLPP).

He was first elected as Council Chairman of Pujehun District in a landslide victory in the 2008 Sierra Leone Local elections. He was easily re-elected again in the 2012 Sierra Leone Local elections with 67.73%, defeating his main opponent Ahmed Ken Kamara who took 14.08%.

References

1969 births
Living people
Sierra Leone People's Party politicians
People from Pujehun District